The Spirit 101 was a Formula One car for the 1984 and 1985 Formula One seasons. The car was designed by Gordon Coppuck and Tim Wright.

Development
Spirit decided to continue in Formula One for 1984 with Hart turbocharged engines. Initially, twice world champion Emerson Fittipaldi and Italian Fulvio Ballabio were slated to drive, with funding from Ballabio's sponsors. However Fittipaldi left to find a drive in Indycars after finding the machine uncompetitive and Ballabio was refused an FIA Super Licence. Instead, Italian Mauro Baldi found funds and was nominated as the team's sole driver, Stefan Johansson being released as he could not find the funding to continue. The 101 was a neat but underpowered car and Baldi struggled to move away from the rear of the grid. Jean-Louis Schlesser had planned to take over from the third race before the threat of litigation from RAM Racing, as he still owed them money.

Racing History

1983
The first version of the car was presented largely incomplete at the Italian Grand Prix and didn't race during the season.

1984

In 1984 the first chassis was adapted to house the Hart 415T engine and become the "101B", with new sidepods. Later a new better build chassis was built and debuted at the 1984 San Marino Grand Prix, while the first was later newly modified as "101C" to adopt the Ford Cosworth DFV (third type of engine in few months), with the previous year side pods, and after the Detroit was refitted with Hart engines to be used as T-Car.

The 101B debuted at the 1984 Brazilian Grand Prix and Baldi retired with a broken distributor. At the South Africa the Italian finished eighth.

The Belgian Grand Prix saw Baldi retire with broken suspension and at the San Marino the Italian finished eighth. The French Grand Prix saw Baldi retire with engine failure.

The Italian failed to qualify for the Monaco.

Baldi was replaced by Dutchman Huub Rothengatter for the Canadian Grand Prix, who was fourteen laps down and was not classified.

For Detroit the Hart Engine was replaced by the Ford Cosworth DFV but the Dutchman failed to qualify. Rothengatter retired from the Dallas Grand Prix with a Fuel Leak, At the British race the Dutchman was nine laps down and was not classified. The German Grand Prix saw Rothengatter finish ninth. At the Austrian race the Dutchman was twenty eight laps down and was not classified.

Rothengatter retired from the Dutch Grand Prix with throttle problems, and finished ninth at Italy.

Baldi replaced Rothengatter for the final two races: the European Grand Prix saw Baldi finish eighth and 15th in Portugal.

The Spirit team had scored no World Championship points during the year.

1985
The 101-02 chassis (having been progressively upgraded throughout 1984) was updated into the Spirit 101D for 1985 and Baldi continued to drive. The first race of 1985 was the 1985 Brazilian Grand Prix and Baldi retired because a turbocharger broke, The Italian spun off and retired at Portugal. The San Marino Grand Prix saw Baldi retire because of an electrical fault. Allen Berg had arranged a deal to take over the seat later in the season. Money was even tighter, however, and after three rounds John Wickham, the co-founder of Spirit, decided to take up an offer from Toleman to buy out the team's tyre contract and folded the F1 outfit.

The Spirit team had scored no World Championship points during the year.

Complete Formula One World Championship results
(key)

References

Spirit Formula One cars